The Uusikylä railway station (formerly ) is located in the city of Lahti (formerly the municipality of Nastola), Finland, in the district of Uusikylä. It is located along the Lahti–Kouvola line, and its neighboring stations are Nastola in the west and Kausala in the east.

History 

Uusikylä is one of the original stations of the intermediate stations of the Lahti–Kouvola section of the Riihimäki–Saint Petersburg railway. At the time of the railway's opening, Uusikylä became the only station situated in the parish of Nastola; the location was chosen for the village's important location in a crossroads between Lahti, Heinola, Anjala and Artjärvi. It became an important freight station on the line; one of the notable types of cargo transported included milk that was bound for Saint Petersburg.

During the Finnish Civil War, upon the landing of Detachment Brandenstein in Loviisa, it proceeded towards Uusikylä and took control of the station, destroying a section of the railway in the process and thus cutting off the Reds' connection to St. Petersburg. The lives of the Germans who fell during these battles are honored by a memorial at the station. Uusikylä became the target of Soviet artillery just three days before the end of the Winter War, on 10 March 1940. There were no deaths, in spite of the idle trains that were then present at the station holding approximately 1,000 people at the time. The station management office as well as that of the post service were then temporarily transferred into a nearby bakery until the completion of the new station building in the same year.

Over the period of heavy industrialization in Nastola, the Uusikylä station was expanded to accommodate the increased demand for freight transport by local companies. Additional warehouses were built starting from the late 1970s, and sidings were built, some of which are still in use and were subject to renovation in 2020, with old wooden sleepers being removed in favour of concrete ones. Passenger services at Uusikylä were ceased in 1971; however, they were restarted upon the electrification of the Lahti–Kouvola section in 1979. In an effort to move the passenger traffic role of the Uusikylä station to a location that would better serve the majority of the population of the municipality of Nastola, it was again closed on 9 January 2005 with the opening of the Nastola halt. The station's platforms were then dismantled on 10-11 May.

Uusikylä, along with Villähde, were subsequently rebuilt and reopened on 12 December 2010, which made Nastola home to a total of three active railway stations. The platforms of the new station were placed approximately  further west compared to the old ones, in the approximate location of the Kanerva halt that was in use in 1954-1969.

Station building and premises 
Its original Class III station building was built according to plans from Knut Nylander, and was completed in 1869. The premises of the station also included a freight warehouse, outhouse, guard's cabin as well as a water tower for maintenance of steam locomotives. The station building was completely destroyed by the fire bombings in March 1940, and was replaced by a new one later in the same year. It is representative of the simple architectural principles of stations from the wartime era with its rectangular shape. A small warehouse is directly connected to the main station building via one of its walls. Save for this warehouse, the building originally had a light plasterwork on its outer surface, but it was later entirely covered with painted wooden boards.

Services 
Uusikylä is served by all commuter trains on the route Lahti–Kouvola, and some of these services are operated from or continue towards Kotka as well. The intermediate stations between Lahti and Kouvola are also served by all but one  rush hour service on the route Helsinki–Lahti–Kouvola. Eastbound trains towards Kouvola stop at track 1 and westbound ones towards Lahti use track 3; track 2 lacks a platform and is only used by long-distance trains passing through the station.

External links 
 
 Train departures at Uusikylä on Finrail

Gallery

References 

Lahti
Railway stations in Päijät-Häme
Railway stations opened in 1870